Del Conte may also refer to:

People
 Jacopino del Conte (1510–1598), Italian Mannerist painter, active in both Rome and Florence.
 Anna Del Conte (born 1925), Italian-born food writer whose works cover the history of food as well as providing recipes. 
 Natali Morris (née Del Conte; born 1978), American online media personality and businesswoman

Places
 Villa del Conte, an Italian municipality of the Province of Padua, Veneto.
 Case del Conte, an Italian village and hamlet of Montecorice (SA), Campania.

See also 
 Conte